Adapedonta is an order of bivalves belonging to the class Bivalvia.

Families:
 Edmondiidae
 Hiatellidae
  †Pachydomidae
 Pharidae
 Solenidae

References

Bivalve orders
Unassigned Euheterodonta